Chen Ping, the founder of TIDEiSun Group, is a policy maker, intellectual scholar, entrepreneur, owner of SunTV, a Chinese-language media.

In 1984, as one of the young and prominent economic experts and policy makers on China's reform and opening up, he attended the historic Moganshan Conference, convened to build up the transformation of the modern China.

After the 1989 Tiananmen Square protests and massacre, he started his career as an international business entrepreneur. In 1992, he established TIDETIME Group in Hong Kong. In 2005, TIDEiSun Group completed the acquisition of SunTV and restructured it into a wholly owned subsidiary media channel, dedicated to the production and broadcasting of independent documentaries and in-depth talk shows focusing on political, social, and economic issues in Chinese society.

Since 2009, Chen Ping has invested in iSunCloud, an encrypted and decentralized cloud storage architecture of security and efficiency. Users of the cloud storage systems become developers and also coordinate with each other to build up a safer and faster data storage mechanism. The idea of establishing a decentralized storage system of automatic computing and communicating networks initiated TIDEiSun Group to conduct a series of research and development efforts in the following decade to create BOLT, TIDEiSun's public blockchain technology.  

As an intellectual, Chen Ping published The Age of Plunder in 2016. The book explores the current global economic and financial mechanism and the reason that it motivates business monopoly, wealth concentration, and stimulates the continuous expansion of the global business oligarchy, which contributes to global income inequality. It can have a snowball effect if left not checked––the global cyclical economic and financial crises as the most disastrous outcome. The world has to be equipped with new technology and especially new models of social, economic, and political governance to renovate itself to avoid the next systematic self-destruction.

As a scholar specialized in economics, Chen Ping further proposes consumer-investor economic theory: consumer spending creates investment value. According to him, consumer spending directly transforms consumers to investors by creating investment value through consumption. The theory effectively balances the consumer interests, investor interests, and enterprise interests. Through the investment returns earned from consumption, consumers have more influences and enjoy more benefits. Thus, the innovative economic model changes the status-quo distribution mechanism and propels transformation of the current economic model of capitalism toward an era of sustainable development.

Based on Chen Ping's innovative economic theory to reform the status-quo economic principle on consumption and investment, TideBit, owned by TIDEiSun, one of the world's safest cryptocurrency exchange platform supporting and the only crypto exchange in the world that supports transactions with fiat currencies of HKD, USD, EUR, and Turkish lira, utilizes the technology advantages of BOLT and has issued TBT, the world's first consumer proprietary tokens.

In 2019, TIDEiSun Group ranks as one of the world's top ten most influential FinTech enterprises by APAC CIOOutlook, a renounced FinTech media platform based in Silicon Valley.

Early life 
Born in Shanghai, China in 1955, Chen Ping grew up in a family where his parents came from a prominent background in the modern Chinese history since the late 19th century. "Both of his parents were idealists, committed to the change they knew the world needed to be better, fairer, more equal. His mother joined the then-progressive Communist Party during her time as a student, seeking a way to empower a common people who had dearly suffered during China’s turbulent history. Meanwhile, his father spent his time making significant strides for the army in military science. The two of them took their vision of a bright future into their own hands. From the time of his youth, his parents’ values of fairness and equality permeated Chen Ping's upbringing. Yet, with the ever-changing political climate, Chen Ping's father found himself branded a traitor. The government banned him from returning to China and to his wife and young son, and Chen Ping would not see his father again for over thirty years. However, it was just before leaving for the USSR that he gifted a young Chen Ping with the full extent of his book collection, passing on a love of knowledge and learning that would stay with Chen Ping for the rest of his days. 'Reading allowed Chen Ping to cultivate his mind and realize his ideological and cultural heritage,' says his biography on the website of his TIDEiSun company, one of the most prominent blockchain companies in East Asia, 'Chen Ping's consistent pursuit of freedom, equality, democracy, and justice in the past fifty years has stemmed from the lessons he learned during this time."

Chen Ping graduated from Anhui Mechanical and Electrical Engineering College in 1973. Chen Ping worked as a technician and senior researcher for a transformer factory in Wuhu, Anhui, and for the Shanghai Machinery Manufacturing Technology Research Institute, the Shanghai Science Institute, the Shanghai Science and Technology, Economic, Social and Strategic Studies Center, and the CITIC International Institute.

Ideologist

The Age of Plunder

The Age of Plunder recorded Chen Ping’s public comments during 2008 – 2011. It is about the 2008 Economics Crisis, its pathogeny, its long-term reverberations and its implications for China’s future. The author indicates this great crisis hasn’t fully subsided and it’s an irredeemable crisis of the “one-legged capitalist” social apparatus.

The author predicted and called for a new civilization (following the industrialized civilization) to overcome the prolonged, painful era of decline. A new emancipation movement is needed to break through the vested interests and mainstream values, to foster new cultures, new ways of living and to build a more fair and equitable democratic society with sustainable economic growth.

In China's perspective, the author proposed that China's party-controlled development model in the past 20 years is in a historical turning point. China has to rebuild a new republic and democratic state with new system, culture and value to achieve sustainable development.

In 2008, as the world financial crisis devastated the economy and on the eve of a larger socioeconomic crisis, Chen Ping keenly observed and pointed out that the 2008 crash was not the same as previous capitalist cyclical economic crises. Rather, it was the crash of a global development model that plunged its corresponding values and social systems into a deep dilemma. In other words, since the crisis of the US subprime mortgage system, the growth model of the globalized modern industrial civilization has come to an end.

“A mature capitalist society based on universal values should not only acknowledge that people are born equal, but also grant them equal access to information in their social lives,” he said in The Age of Plunder, a book chronicling his comments during the 2008 economic crisis. It was in his pursuit of this equality and fairness that he discovered something revolutionary. In 2001, he began to invest in the blockchain. The blockchain is a system with no one person in charge, but rather a system with collective, equal responsibility. No information can be tampered with, with an option for privacy. Its values of equality and fairness resonated with Ping: this was the system he had been looking for.

iSun Media Group 
Midnight and Debate were two talk-show programs hosted by Chen Ping in 2013. Commenting on topics varying from philosophy, history to current events, he put together more than 300 well-known guests to have open discussion and free debate including He Weifang, Zhang Yihe, Lu Yaogang, Li Rui, Zhang Sizhi, Zi Zhongxun, etc. On this electrifying television platform where minds meet and diverse, top Chinese public intellectuals and scholars gave independent viewpoints about the most controversial social, political and historical issues. The Chinese public intellectuals who were blacklisted by the government could finally talk freely about politics and everything in Midnight and Debate on SunTV.

Isun Affairs Weekly Magazine
Soon after launched in 2011, iSun Affairs Weekly Magazine, the first multi-media online magazine of video, audio, and printing content in Hong Kong, immediately became a beacon of hope, freedom, and intellectual independence. It was a four-time prize winner of the Society of Publishers in Asia (SOPA). In 2013, it was banned in mainland China and later suspended the publication for restructure.

Politics

China 
Chen Ping was a leader in academic thinking and practical strategy for China's reform and opening. In 1984, as one of the young and prominent economic experts and policy makers on China's reform and opening up, he attended the historic Moganshan Conference, convened to build up the transformation of the modern China. The in-depth strategic reform Chen Ping proposed at the conference was taken under serious consideration by state leaders at the time and later became a pillar of modern Chinese development.

Chen Ping's research during this period was focused on effectively encouraging and implementing China's reform, including topics like “China’s countermeasures for a new technological revolution”, “Building an Eurasian diplomatic bridge”, “Establishing policies to support high-tech development districts”, China's Industrial Vision”, “Shenzhen Economic Zone Special Inspection Report”, “Social Ecology” and so on. Many of these solutions and suggestions have been incorporated into recent advances in China's rapid social practice and development, such as “The Belt and Road Initiative.

Malaysia 
Chen Ping helped bring together opposition parties ten years ago, which laid the foundation for the allied opposition parties winning the democratic movement, a nearly impossible election victory in the modern Malaysia history.

Japan 
TideiSun Group has a long-term business partnership with Sony and Toyota. Sun TV has made a series of documentaries walking audiences through Japan's most prominent political families and outlines their visions on Japan's past, present, and future.

Entrepreneur 
Since 2009, Chen Ping has started investment into the R&D of blockchain technology. Today, as a multi-business enterprise across the sectors of media and broadcasting, blockchain technology R&D, and capital investment, TIDEiSun provides premium FinTech products and services, including R&D of blockchain technology, management and operation of crypto exchange platforms, development and application of digital currencies wallets, blockchain-based FinTech services, decentralized cloud storage, and AI-based financial media platform. TIDEiSun has two headquarters in Hong Kong and Taiwan, with its staff members located in Taipei, Tokyo, and New York, specializing in technology R&D, marketing, business development, and media.

As an industry trailblazer, TIDEiSun aims to renovate the traditional venture capital business by adopting Chen Ping's innovative theory and practices of token economics. Particularly, TIDEiSun leads the wave of token economy by accelerating the enterprise application of blockchain technology.

TIDEiSun Finance: Aims to renovate the financial industry and service models by adopting blockchain and token economics. Particularly, the blockchain-based business line of TIDEiSun Finance includes:

 TideBit: the world's only cryptocurrency exchange that supports transactions with HKD, USD, EUR, and Turkish lira. TideBit is also the world's first cryptocurrency exchange that has its trading data accessible on the public chain to achieve the strategic business aim of creating a consumption-investment value creation ecosystem. It also guarantees transparency and legality of the transactions. As widely recognized in the industry, TideBit ranks as one of the top-25 safest crypto exchange. TideBit has achieved rich experience in applying blockchain technology into platform architecture and building up a complete financial service ecosystem, including crypto exchanges, an option trading platform, a token gaming platform, and an e-commerce system providing blockchain-based traceability solution. TideBit also aims to boost the development of the second generation of token economy. Abiding by the foundational concepts and principles of blockchain and token economics, TideBit looks forward to cooperating with business entities and projects to develop innovative token products that have potentials to renovate the market.
 iSunOne: a blockchain-based stable-coin payment solution to provide private and fast online and offline payment methods, encrypted social communication, and blockchain-based traceability solution.
 XPA Exchange: an assets transaction platform based on DLT smart contracts.
 XPA Assets: a series of ERC20-formatted digital assets that are anchored to fiat currency.  

TIDEiSun Technology: Aims to utilize the technological advantage of blockchain and AI to build up a permissionless value ecosystem to achieve sustainable development and social justice.

TIDEiSun Assets Management: Aims to bridge the traditional investment banking business and token economy by adopting blockchain technology to provide a globalized business service and international consulting service on assets arrangement and strategic transformation, assets operation, public listing, and private equity management.

Attack in Hong Kong 
On about 3 June 2013 at 6 pm, Chen Ping in Chai Wan One, at the new Owen Center on Yip Street, was ambushed by two men, about 30 years old, according to police reports. Both men were armed with sticks. They struck Chen on the head. He was subsequently sent to Eastern Hospital. On June 5, Chen held a press conference about the incident, stating that the two assailants did not say anything, so he couldn't discern an accent, nor could he discern a motive, but was still suffering from tinnitus as a result. Police also quoted Chen Ping, and said the assailants planned an escape route to deliberately evade security cameras. Later, Chen Ping received a letter issued by the legal department of the Oriental Daily requesting the deletion of the online version of the report, but Sun TV refused to retract their findings.

The incident was revealed by the 2015 Annual Report of the U.S.-CHINA Economic and Security Commission and the 2015 Report on Hong Kong Press Freedom.

References

Chinese business executives
Businesspeople from Shanghai
Chinese academics
Living people
Year of birth missing (living people)